Ripley is a small, unincorporated community in Franklin Township situated upon a slope, just east of Hancock on M-26 and across the Portage Lake Canal from Houghton.

A ski resort called Mont Ripley is located in Ripley. The now-closed Quincy Smelting Works, formerly operated by the Quincy Mine, is also located in Ripley.

References

External links
 View of Ripley from Houghton
 View of the Portage Lake Lift Bridge and Portage Lake from Ripley

Unincorporated communities in Houghton County, Michigan
Houghton micropolitan area, Michigan
Unincorporated communities in Michigan